Ciceu-Giurgești is a commune in Bistrița-Năsăud County, Transylvania, Romania. It is composed of two villages, Ciceu-Giurgești and Dumbrăveni (Gáncs). It also included three other villages until 2002, when they were split off to form Negrilești Commune.

The commune is located in the eastern part of the county, on the border with Cluj County. It lies on the banks of the river Valea Mare.

References

Communes in Bistrița-Năsăud County
Localities in Transylvania